Joose is an open-source self-hosting metaobject system for JavaScript with support for classes, inheritance, mixins, traits and aspect-oriented programming.

The Joose meta-object system is multi-paradigm. It supports class-based and prototype-based programming styles as well as class-based inheritance and role-based extension. While other JavaScript frameworks often specialize on DOM-access and AJAX, Joose specializes solely on bringing successful programming techniques to the JavaScript scripting language. Joose is thus often used in conjunction with another DOM/Ajax JavaScript framework and is tested with jQuery, YUI, Dojo, ExtJS, Prototype, Mootools and PureMVC.

Joose was heavily inspired by Moose, the object system for Perl 5 which was itself inspired by the Perl 6 object system, but unlike Perl and Moose, Joose doesn't support multiple inheritance.

Example 

Two classes written in Joose:

Class("Point", {
    has: {
        x: {is: "rw"},
        y: {is: "rw"}
    },
    methods: {
        clear: function () {
            this.setX(0);
            this.setY(0);
        }
    }
});

Class("Point3D", {
    isa: Point,
    has: {
        z: {is: "rw"}
    },
    after: {
        clear: function () {
            this.setZ(0);
        }
    }
});

Point3D is a subclass of Point. It has another attribute defined and additional code to run after running the superclass clear() method. The "rw" means the attribute is readable and writable with a pair of get/set accessors generated automatically.

References 

 Ajaxian
 Google Gears blog

External links 
 Official website
 Official Joose 2 website
 Joose Mailing List
 Presentation: Software development with JavaScript and Joose

JavaScript libraries